Ebaku Nzoh Akumenzoh (born 7 March 1989) is a Cameroonian basketball player who plays for FAP Basketball and .

National team career
Akumenzoh plays for the Cameroonian national basketball team and has played in the qualifiers for AfroBasket 2017.

BAL career statistics

|-
| style="text-align:left;"|2021
| style="text-align:left;"|FAP
| 4 || 0 || 15.9 || .364 || – || .250 || 3.3|| .8 || 1.0 || .5 || 4.3
|-
|- class="sortbottom"
| style="text-align:center;" colspan="2"|Career
| 4 || 0 || 15.9 || .364 || – || .250 || 3.3|| .8 || 1.0 || .5 || 4.3

References

1989 births
Nzui-Manto players
People from Buea
Living people
Cameroonian men's basketball players
FAP Basketball players
Condor BC players